Heberth Antonio González Sánchez (born 31 May 1958) is a Colombian former footballer who played as a right-back. He competed in the men's tournament at the 1980 Summer Olympics.

References

Living people
1958 births
People from Caldas Department
Colombian footballers
Association football fullbacks
Colombia international footballers
Olympic footballers of Colombia
Footballers at the 1980 Summer Olympics
Categoría Primera A players
Deportes Quindío footballers
Deportivo Pereira footballers
Deportes Tolima footballers
Atlético Nacional footballers